Terror of the Garrison (German: Der Schrecken der Garnison) is a 1931 German comedy film directed by Carl Boese and starring Felix Bressart, Lucie Englisch and Adele Sandrock.

It was one of several military farces directed by Boese in the early 1930s.

Cast
 Felix Bressart as Musketier Kulicke  
 Lucie Englisch as Antonie Bock  
 Adele Sandrock as Erbprinzessin Adelheid 
 Tamara Desni as Annemarie  
 Olga Limburg as Institutsvorsteherin  
 Albert Paulig as Major  
 Kurt Vespermann as Leutnant Schmidt  
 Heinrich Fuchs as Leutnant von Prittwitz  
 Ernst Behmer as Stabsarzt  
 Fritz Spira as von Nachtigall  
 Gaston Briese as von Witte  
 Hugo Fischer-Köppe as Wachtmeister Brennecke 
 Karl Harbacher as Bock - Photograph

References

Bibliography
 Bock, Hans-Michael & Bergfelder, Tim. The Concise Cinegraph: Encyclopaedia of German Cinema. Berghahn Books, 2009.

External links
 

1931 comedy films
German comedy films
1931 films
Films of the Weimar Republic
1930s German-language films
Films directed by Carl Boese
Military humor in film
Films set in the 1900s
German black-and-white films
1930s German films